Michael Poettoz  (born August 21, 1998)  is an alpine skier representing Colombia. Poettoz was born in Cali and was adopted by a French family when he was aged 21 months. Poettoz grew up and learned how to ski in Les Carroz d'Araches, France.

Career

2016
Poettoz became the first Colombian to compete in the Winter Youth Olympics in Lillehammer, Norway. In the slalom event, Poettoz did not finish the first run. In the giant slalom, Poettoz finished 35th in the first run with a time of 1:24.70. Poettoz, however, did not finish the second run.

2017
In 2017, Poettoz became the first ever person to be born in Colombia to qualify for the Winter Olympics.

2022 
Poettoz competed for Colombia at the 2022 Winter Olympics.

See also
Colombia at the 2016 Winter Youth Olympics
Colombia at the 2018 Winter Olympics
Cynthia Denzler - First Colombian to compete at the Winter Olympics, in 2010

References

1998 births
Living people
Colombian male alpine skiers
Sportspeople from Cali
French adoptees
French people of Colombian descent
Alpine skiers at the 2018 Winter Olympics
Alpine skiers at the 2022 Winter Olympics
Olympic alpine skiers of Colombia
Alpine skiers at the 2016 Winter Youth Olympics